Mariniflexile is a genus in the phylum Bacteroidota (Bacteria). The various species have been recovered from sea water, sea urchins, springs, brackish water, and an oyster.

Etymology
The name Mariniflexile derives from: Latin adjective marinus. Latin participle adjective flexilis -e, pliant, pliable, flexible; New Latin neuter gender noun Mariniflexile, is a marine bacterium. The bacteria are rods, aerobic, move by gliding, gram negative, non-spore forming, and when grown on appropriate medium, the colonies are orange.

Species
The genus contains the following species:

 M. fucanivorans ( Barbeyron et al. 2008, ; New Latin noun fucanum, fucan (polyfucose); Latin participle adjective vorans, devouring; New Latin participle adjective fucanivorans, fucan-devouring.)
 M. gromovii ( Nedashkovskaya et al. 2006,  (Type species of the genus).; New Latin genitive case masculine gender noun gromovii, of Gromov, in honour of B. V. Gromov, the Russian aquatic and marine microbiologist.)
M. aquimaris ( Wayne et al. 1987 ; Stackebrandt & Goebel, 1994).) 
M. jejuense (2006 emend. Jung and Yoon 2013.)
M. soesokkakense (2006 Nedashkovskaya et al.; 2006 emend. Jung and Yoon 2013.)
M. ostreae (Park et al. 2015, sp. nov)

See also
 Bacterial taxonomy
 Microbiology
Marine microorganism

References

Flavobacteria
Gram-negative bacteria
Bacteria genera